The 2020–21 season was Millwall's 136th year in existence, 94th consecutive season in the Football League, and 44th in the second tier. Millwall competed in the Championship for the fourth consecutive season and finished in 11th place. They also played in the FA Cup where they reached the fourth round, and the League Cup where they reached the third round. This season marked the first time in Millwall's history that they played more seasons in the second tier (44) than the third tier (43).

First-team squad

Statistics

|-
!colspan=14|Players who left the club during the season:

|}

Goals record

Disciplinary record

Transfers

Transfers in

Loans in

Loans out

Transfers out

Pre-season and friendlies

Competitions

Overview

EFL Championship

League table

Results summary

Results by matchday

Matches
The 2020–21 season fixtures were released on 21 August.

FA Cup

The third round draw was made on 30 November, with Premier League and EFL Championship clubs all entering the competition. The draw for the fourth and fifth round were made on 11 January, conducted by Peter Crouch.

EFL Cup

The first round draw was made on 18 August, live on Sky Sports, by Paul Merson. The draw for both the second and third round were confirmed on September 6, live on Sky Sports by Phil Babb.

Notes

References

External links

Millwall F.C. seasons
Millwall F.C.
Millwall
Millwall